Etzwilen railway station is a railway station in the Swiss canton of Thurgau and municipality of Wagenhausen. It takes its name from the nearby settlement of Etzwilen. The station is located on the Lake Line, which links Schaffhausen with Konstanz, at its junction with the Winterthur–Etzwilen line and the Etzwilen to Singen freight line. It is served by local trains only.

Services 
Etzwilen is served by the S1 of the St. Gallen S-Bahn and S29 of the Zürich S-Bahn:

 : half-hourly service over the Winterthur–Etzwilen line to Winterthur and the Lake line to Stein am Rhein.

References

External links
 
 

Etzwilen
Etzwilen